Zinc finger protein 536 is a protein that in humans is encoded by the ZNF536 gene.

References

Further reading